Joseph Schlitz (May 15, 1831 – May 7, 1875) was a German-American entrepreneur who made his fortune in the brewing industry.

Early life

Joseph Schlitz was born on May 15, 1831 in Mainz, Hesse-Darmstadt. He emigrated to the U.S. in 1850.

Career

In 1856, he assumed management of the Krug Brewery in Milwaukee, Wisconsin. In 1858 when he married Krug's widow, he changed the name of the company to the Joseph Schlitz Brewing Company. He became more successful after the Great Chicago Fire of 1871.  Many of Chicago's breweries that had burned never reopened. Schlitz established a distribution point there and acquired a large part of the Chicago market.

Death

Schlitz perished with 340 others in the wreck of the SS Schiller in thick fog off the Isles of Scilly on May 7, 1875. The islands lie 26 miles west of Cornwall, England. Schlitz was returning via New York and Hamburg, visiting Germany. His body was never recovered.  He was 43 years old.  A cenotaph at Forest Home Cemetery, Milwaukee honors him.

Personal life

Schlitz was a Freemason and was affiliated with Aurora Lodge No. 30.

Gallery

See also

 Eberhard Anheuser
 Jacob Best
 Valentin Blatz
 Adolphus Busch
 Adolph Coors
 Gottlieb Heileman
 Frederick Miller
 Frederick Pabst
 August Uihlein

References

Further reading

Uwe Spiekermann, "Political Revolution, Emigration, and Establishing a Regional Player in Brewing: August Krug and Joseph Schlitz." In Immigrant Entrepreneurship: German-American Business Biographies, 1720 to the Present, vol. 2, edited by William J. Hausman and the German Historical Institute. Last modified September 19, 2016.

External links
 

1831 births
1875 deaths
American drink industry businesspeople
German emigrants to the United States
Businesspeople from Milwaukee
Deaths due to shipwreck at sea
American brewers
19th-century American businesspeople